Ivory Coast (Côte d'Ivoire) has 660 kilometres of railway (1995 estimate).

The railway was built during the French colonial period, and links the port city of Abidjan with Ouagadougou, the capital of Burkina Faso.

Railway links with adjacent countries
  Burkina Faso - yes - 
  Ghana - no - break of gauge /
  Mali - no - same gauge
  Guinea - no - same gauge
  Liberia - no - break of gauge /

Timeline

2010
 In October 2010, the government announced plans to build a 737 km line which would link the port of San Pedro to mines in the west of the country.

2015
 The first two of six GT26 locomotives arrived from NRE in June 2015.

2016
 Six locomotives were ordered from Grindrod.

2019
 Three BDe 4/4 II electric railcars, three ABt driving cars and nine second class coaches, formerly in service for Appenzeller Bahnen in Switzerland, were bought by Société de Transport Ivoiro-Burkinabe. They are to be used on services between Abidjan in Côte d'Ivoire and Ouagadougou in Burkina Faso.
 A bilateral agreement between Côte d'Ivoire and Burkina Faso for the modernisation and extension of the railway line connecting Abidjan, Ouagadougou, and Kaya was signed in July 2019.

Gallery

See also
 Railway stations in Ivory Coast
 Transport in Ivory Coast

References

External links

 UNHCR Atlas Map Côte d'Ivoire
 UN Map Côte d'Ivoire

 
Metre gauge railways in Ivory Coast